The Enrique T. Yuchengco College of Business at Laguna (ETYCB) is one of the five degree offering colleges under the Malayan Colleges Laguna.

Programs Offered
The E. T. Yuchengco College of Business offers the following degree programs:
 Bachelor of Science in Accountancy;
 Bachelor of Science in Entrepreneurship;
 Bachelor of Science in Hotel and Restaurant Management; and
 Bachelor of Science in Tourism Management.

Facilities
Accounting Room
Bar and Restaurant
Commercial Kitchen Laboratory
Executive Suite Hotel Room
Food Laboratory
Single Suite Hotel Room
Twin Suite Hotel Room

References

Malayan Colleges Laguna
MCL E.T. Yuchengco College of Business

External links
Mapúa Institute of Technology

Educational institutions established in 2007
Universities and colleges in Laguna (province)
2007 establishments in the Philippines
Education in Cabuyao